Pyrazolidine is a heterocyclic compound. It is a liquid that is stable in air, but it is hygroscopic.

Preparation
Pyrazolidine can be produced by cyclization of 1,3-dichloropropane or 1,3-dibromopropane with hydrazine:

See also
 Pyrazole
 Pyrazoline

References

Pyrazolidines